Artona martini is a species of moth of the family Zygaenidae. It is found in China and Japan and has also been observed in New Zealand.

References

Moths described in 1997
Procridinae
Moths of New Zealand
Moths of Japan
Insects of China